Rędziny  is a village in Częstochowa County, Silesian Voivodeship, in southern Poland. It is the seat of the gmina (administrative district) called Gmina Rędziny.

The village has a population of 4,753.

Postal code: 42-242

References

Villages in Częstochowa County